Phillip Lee Sobocinski (born December 6, 1945) is a former American football center in the National Football League. He played six games for the Atlanta Falcons in 1968. He played at the collegiate level at the University of Wisconsin–Madison.

After his football career ended, he earned a PhD in educational administration and later became a school district superintendent.

References

1945 births
Living people
People from South Milwaukee, Wisconsin
Players of American football from Wisconsin
American football centers
Wisconsin Badgers football players
Atlanta Falcons players